Ban Yang is the name of:
 Ban Yang (Laos), a village
 Ban Yang, Thailand, several places; see List of tambon in Thailand – B
 Ban Yang, Phitsanulok, a subdistrict in the Wat Bot District of Phitsanulok Province, Thailand

See also
 Ban Yaeng, a subdistrict in the Nakhon Thai District of Phitsanulok Province, Thailand